The term Tourism 4.0 originates from the modern paradigm in industry, known as Industry 4.0 and aims to improve the added value to tourism through innovation, knowledge, technology and creativity. Therefore, the aim of Tourism 4.0 is to develop a model of collaboration that minimizes the negative impact of tourism, while at the same time improving the overall experience.

Background 
The Tourism 4.0 initiative was launched in 2017 by the company Arctur after identifying the lack of readiness level to embrace the use of the key enabling technologies from Industry 4.0 (Internet of Things, Artificial Intelligence, Big Data, Virtual Reality, Augmented Reality, etc.), especially by small and medium enterprises in the tourism sector. As a consequence, the Tourism 4.0 Partnership has been established to enable collaboration of any stakeholder in the world to participate in research or development of tourism of the future. Its aim is to boost the R&D spirit in tourism sector. It brings together a consortium of highly relevant industrial organizations, top research organizations in tourism, information technology and other sectors.

Tourism 4.0 builds on two fundamental ideas in which technology serves only as a mean. First idea is that the preservation of the quality of life of local residents, is in the center and all other stakeholder around them. Whatever solution is developed within this frame, should respect this. Second, tourism should build on data-driven strategic planning aligned with the UN Sustainable Development Goals with data collected on local level.

Tourism 4.0 Ecosystem 

The Collaboration Platform connects the T4.0 Core APIs with the technology pillars (TIM, FLOWS, CIT and DOTI) into a comprehensive business innovation ecosystem Tourism 4.0. Key enabling technologies from Industry 4.0 support transparent and secure data exchange between technology pillars and applications to co-create a new sustainable model of collaborative tourism.

Tourism Impact Model - TIM 
The first pillar, Tourism Impact Model (TIM) is a tool that uses real data to create an objective picture of the impact of tourism in a certain micro-location. It analyses different societal aspects: from environment, economy and culture to collaboration. By modelling the impact with the use of different scenarios, it acts also as a digital twin of a tourist destination and allows data-driven strategic planning aligned with the UN Sustainable Development Goals.

TIM has been awarded as the Best Innovation in the field of Artificial Intelligence and Data Analytics at the Tourism Innovation Summit 2020 in Spain and with Golden plaquette for best innovation of North Primorska by the Chamber of Commerce and Industry of Slovenia.

Tourist Flows 
The second pillar supports tourist destination managers, service providers or researchers who want to better understand tourist flows: what impact traffic flows have, when occur traffic peaks, what are the seasonal effects, which areas are more / less congested with tourists, how the weather, holidays and other events affect.

FLOWS enable GDPR compliant advanced analyses and forecasts of tourist movements based on anonymised data from a multitude of different sources (traffic counters, data from mobile operators, freely accessible Wi-Fi networks, tourist tax, vignettes sold, water and energy consumption, waste, social media posts, etc.).

Collaboration Impact Token - CIT 
Collaboration Impact Token is a digital voucher that changes its value according to location and time. It is an innovative tool that establishes a comprehensive system of rewarding and promoting the positive behaviour of all stakeholders of tourism ecosystem and improving the positive effects of tourism. CIT is based on a private blockchain network and cannot be traded. The obtained CIT tokens are stored by the user in the DOTI digital personal wallet, while part of the anonymised data related to transactions and the use of CIT is stored and processed in T4.0 Core.

Digital Online Tourist Identity - DOTI 
DOTI is a personal digital passport that allows the individual (tourist) to maintain the ownership and full control of own data. Moreover, the DOTI mobile application is a secure space for storage of personal data and preferences and a tool for completely anonymous communication with tourist providers.

Heritage+ 
Heritage+ is a sub-programme of Tourism 4.0 programme, specialised in digital interpretation solution for cultural heritage field and GLAM field, often called "digital innovation of cultural heritage". Main activities within the sub-programme are creation of new enriched tourist experiences based on cultural heritage. It uses advanced technologies for digital capture (photogrammetry, laser scanning, 360° photo and video), simulated reconstruction (3D modelling) and presentation (Augmented Reality, Virtual Reality, Mixed Reality, Holographic projections, touch-screen) of cultural heritage, combined with hybrid skills of digital interpretation, digital storytelling, digital business model development, and strategic planning of digital transformation. Beside interpretation and presentation purposes, results are often used in research, documentation and conservation of cultural heritage.

Heritage+ works with both movable and immovable cultural heritage, combining them with audio and video materials and production on intangible cultural heritage. One of the main rationales behind the Heritage+ sub-programme is that digitally enriched cultural heritage can be a catalyst for quality of life and neighbourhoods, uniqueness of places, direct and indirect jobs in tourism, crafts, creative industries and commerce, source of tourist narratives and stories, creativity and innovation, it increases property value, stimulates education and learning, and creates a feeling of belonging and identity. In 2019, Heritage+ has initiated the development of "T4.0 Technical guidelines: Digitisation of cultural heritage" that represent the basic technical standards in the process of digitisation of cultural heritage and have been widely adopted in Slovenia.  In 2019, Heritage+ was awarded Silver Prize for Innovation at the annual ceremony by the Northern Primorska Chamber of Commerce and Industry.

Research and development projects 
Several national and international research and development projects related to the topic have been running since the launch of the Tourism 4.0 initiative.

 Tourism 4.0 TRL 3-6
 Demo Pilot Turizem 4.0
 T4.0 for the Black Sea
 Heritage in Action
 Amazing AoE
 Insites - Digitising Cultural Heritage Custodians
 WEAVE  - Widen European Access to cultural communities Via Europeana
 etc.

One of the first initiatives worldwide as reaction to COVID-19 situation has been co-initiated within the Tourism 4.0 partnership called #TourismFromZero.

References

External links
 Initiative website

Tourism